A by-election to the British House of Commons constituency of Middlesbrough East was held on 14 March 1962.

Result
The seat was a hold for the Labour Party.

See also
List of United Kingdom by-elections
Middlesbrough

References

1962 elections in the United Kingdom
1962 in England
1960s in Yorkshire
East